Holy Trinity Church, also known as Old Swedes, is a historic church at East 7th and Church Street in Wilmington, Delaware. It was consecrated on Trinity Sunday, June 4, 1699, by a predominantly Swedish congregation formerly of the colony of New Sweden.  The church, designated a National Historic Landmark in 1961, is among the few surviving public buildings that reflect the Swedish colonial effort.  The church is considered part of First State National Historical Park. The church, which is often visited by tourists, remains open for tours and religious activities.

The church appears on the obverse of the 1937 Delaware Tercentenary half dollar.

History
The church was built in 1698–99 in territory that had been the colony of New Sweden until 1655.  The building materials were local blue granite and Swedish bricks that had been used as ship's ballast. The church is situated on the site of the Fort Christina's burial ground, which dates to 1638. The church claims to be "the nation's oldest church building still used for worship as originally built". There are reportedly over 15,000 burials in the churchyard. Lutheran church services were held in the Swedish language well into the 18th century.

John Hansson Steelman provided significant donations which enabled the construction of the church, including £320 for the purchase of land for the church at Fort Christina and for the building of the church, £220 by loans and £100 by gift He received in return the promise that he and his wife would be buried within the church, which was not done, as they moved to Pennsylvania in the 1730s. 

In 1697, the Church of Sweden renewed its commitment to Swedish settlers in the Delaware Valley and sent three missionaries, Jonas Auren, Eric Bjork, and Andreas Rudman, to the area. A total of three churches with similar architecture were built or established by Swedish communities in the area about the same time. All are generally known as "Old Swedes" and later joined the Episcopal Church.  Gloria Dei (Old Swedes') Church in Philadelphia was founded in 1697 and the building was completed in 1700.  Trinity Church in Swedesboro, New Jersey was founded in 1703, with its current building completed in 1784.

Five other Swedish churches were founded in the 18th century: St. Mary Anne's Episcopal Church in North East, Maryland; Old St. Gabriel's Episcopal Church in Douglassville, Pennsylvania; St. George's Episcopal in Churchtown, New Jersey; St. James Kingsessing in Philadelphia; and Christ Church (Old Swedes) in Upper Merion Township, Pennsylvania.

Holy Trinity in Wilmington has housed an Episcopal parish since 1791 and is now part of the Episcopal Diocese of Delaware. An earlier church in New Sweden was built in Swanwyck, near New Castle about 1662, which was replaced by a combined church and fort at Crane Hook in 1667. In 1958, the historic Hendrickson House was moved to the grounds of the church. The church building was declared a National Historic Landmark in 1961. Trinity Parish operates two church buildings in Wilmington, both listed on the National Register of Historic Places: the main building on North Adams, and Old Swedes at East 7th and Church Streets.

Burials in churchyard
Notable burials include:
Alexis Irenee du Pont Bayard (1918–1985), lieutenant governor of Delaware
Elizabeth Bradford du Pont Bayard (1880–1975)
James A. Bayard (1799–1880), U.S. Senator
Richard Bayard (1796–1868), first mayor of Wilmington, U.S. Senator
Thomas F. Bayard, Sr. (1828–1898), secretary of state under President Cleveland
Thomas F. Bayard, Jr. (1868–1942), U.S. Senator
Dr. Joseph Capelle, a Revolutionary War veteran
Catharina and Britta Cock (d. 1726)
Major Peter Jaquett, a Revolutionary War veteran
The Right Reverend Alfred Lee, first bishop of the Episcopal Diocese of Delaware
Ignatius Grubb (1841–1927), justice of the Delaware State Supreme Court.
George R. McLane (1819–1855), American physician and politician
Captain Hugh Montgomery, captain of the brig Nancy, raised the first American flag in a foreign port
Elizabeth Montgomery, daughter of Captain Hugh Montgomery
Hans Jurgen Smidt (1696-1753) and Mary Stalcop (1696-1750), ancestors of Devil Anse Hatfield of the Hatfield-McCoy feud.
Carl Christopher Springer, first warden
William Vandever (d. 1718), grave marked with the oldest legible stone
Samuel White (1770–1809), U.S. Senator
James Harrison Wilson (1837–1925) Union general in the Civil War

See also
 National Register of Historic Places listings in Wilmington, Delaware
 List of National Historic Landmarks in Delaware
 New Sweden
List of the oldest buildings in Delaware
 List of cemeteries in Delaware
Oldest churches in the United States
 Gloria Dei (Old Swedes') Church — in Philadelphia, Pennsylvania

References

External links

Old Swedes Foundation website
Trinity Parish website
Swedish Colonial Society
 History of Holy Trinity (Old Swedes) Church 1697-1773
 Historic Churches of American by Nellie Urner Wallington, 1907.

Historic American Buildings Survey in Delaware
Episcopal church buildings in Delaware
Churches in Wilmington, Delaware
National Historic Landmarks in Delaware
Churches on the National Register of Historic Places in Delaware
1699 establishments in Delaware
17th-century Episcopal church buildings
Museums in Wilmington, Delaware
History museums in Delaware
National Register of Historic Places in Wilmington, Delaware
Churches completed in 1699
First State National Historical Park
Swedish-American history
Swedish-American culture in Delaware
New Sweden
Churches in New Sweden